Kaylee Rochelle McKeown  (born 12 July 2001) is an Australian swimmer and triple Olympic gold medalist. She is the world record holder in the long course 100 metre backstroke and both the long course and short course 200 metre backstroke. She won Gold in both the 100 metre and 200 metre backstroke, as well as the 4×100 metre medley relay at the 2020 Summer Olympics staged in Tokyo in 2021.

Background
Kaylee McKeown was just 15 years old when she joined her older sister Taylor on the Australian Dolphins swim team. She was one of the youngest members. She currently trains with the Griffith University swim group with Michael Bohl as her coach.

Career
When she was 15 years old, McKeown competed at the 2016 Junior Pan Pacific Swimming Championships, held in August in Maui, Hawaii, United States, winning the gold medal in the 200 metre backstroke with a time of 2:10.01 and the bronze medal in the 100 metre backstroke with a time of 1:01.01.

The following year, McKeown competed in the women's 200 metre backstroke event at the 2017 World Aquatics Championships. As a 16-year-old the next year, she was the youngest woman on the Swimming Australia roster for the 2018 Pan Pacific Swimming Championships.

Leading up to the 2020 Summer Olympics, McKeown was the fastest swimmer in the 200 metre individual medley but withdrew from the event to concentrate on the backstroke. She won the 100 metre backstroke at the 2020 Tokyo Olympics setting a new Olympic record of 57.47 seconds.

2022 World Short Course Championships
Following her performances at the 2022 Australian Short Course Swimming Championships, held in Sydney in August, McKeown was named to the roster for the 2022 World Short Course Championships. On the first day of competition, she ranked twelfth in the preliminaries of the 100 metre backstroke, qualifying for the semifinals with her time of 57.11 seconds. Later in the morning, she qualified for the final of the 200 metre individual medley with an overall rank of fourth in the preliminaries with a time of 2:06.07. In the evening session, she started off with a bronze medal-win in the 200 metre individual medley in an Oceanian, Commonwealth, and Australian record time of 2:03.57 before qualifying for the final of the 100 metre backstroke approximately 20 minutes later with a time of 56.35 seconds that ranked her sixth across both semifinal heats.

On day two, McKeown won the gold medal in the 100 metre backstroke with a personal best time of 55.49 seconds. The morning of day three, she ranked tenth in the preliminaries of the 50 metre backstroke with a time of 26.24 seconds and advanced to the semifinals. In the evening semifinals, she placed ninth with a time of 26.09 seconds. Two days later, she swam the backstroke portion of the 4×50 metre medley relay in the preliminaries in a time of 26.42 seconds, helping qualify the relay to the final ranking first in an Oceanian and Australian record time of 1:44.78. When the finals relay placed first in a time of 1:42.35, she won a gold medal for her efforts in the preliminaries.

Day six of six, McKeown started in the morning in the preliminaries of the 200 metre backstroke, where she ranked second in 2:02.32 and advanced to the final. In the final, she was the only one to finish in a time faster than 2:00.00, winning the gold medal with a 1:59.26 that was 0.32 seconds slower than her world record mark from 2020. She concluded the session with a silver medal in the 4×100 metre medley relay, leading-off with a 55.74 for the backstroke portion to help finish in an Oceanian, Commonwealth, and Australian record time of 3:44.92.

Results in major championships

 McKeown swam only in the preliminary heats.

Career best times

Long course metres (50 m pool)

Short course metres (25 m pool)

World records

Long course metres

Short course metres

Olympic records

Long course metres

 split 58.01 for backstroke leg; with Chelsea Hodges (breaststroke), Emma McKeon (butterfly), Cate Campbell (freestyle)

Awards and honours
 In the 2022 Australia Day Honours McKeown was awarded the Medal of the Order of Australia.

Personal life
In August 2020, McKeown's father, Sholto, died after a two-year battle with brain cancer. She has a tattoo on her foot in his memory that says, "I'll always be with you".

McKeown has been dating fellow Australian national team member and 2020 Olympian Brendon Smith since February 2022.

See also
 List of Youth Olympic Games gold medalists who won Olympic gold medals

References

External links
 
 

2001 births
Living people
Australian female backstroke swimmers
Australian female medley swimmers
World Aquatics Championships medalists in swimming
Swimmers at the 2018 Summer Youth Olympics
Youth Olympic gold medalists for Australia
Swimmers at the 2020 Summer Olympics
Medalists at the 2020 Summer Olympics
Olympic gold medalists for Australia
Recipients of the Medal of the Order of Australia
Olympic gold medalists in swimming
Olympic bronze medalists for Australia
Olympic bronze medalists in swimming
Olympic swimmers of Australia
Sportswomen from Queensland
Swimmers at the 2022 Commonwealth Games
Commonwealth Games medallists in swimming
Commonwealth Games gold medallists for Australia
Commonwealth Games silver medallists for Australia
Commonwealth Games bronze medallists for Australia
21st-century Australian women
Medalists at the FINA World Swimming Championships (25 m)
Medallists at the 2022 Commonwealth Games